Hindu mythology is the body of myths and literature attributed to, and espoused by, the adherents of the Hindu religion, found in Sanskrit texts such as the Vedic literature, epics like Mahabharata and Ramayana, the Puranas, and myths specific to a particular ethnolinguistic group like the Tamil Periya Puranam and Divya Prabandham, and the Mangal Kavya of Bengal. Hindu myths are also found in widely translated popular texts such as the fables of the Panchatantra and the Hitopadesha, as well as in Southeast Asian texts.

Primary sources 

 Vedas
 Rig
 Sama
 Yajur
 Atharva
 Itihasa
 Ramayana
 Mahabharata
 Major Puranas
Agni Purana
Brahma Purana
Brahmanda Purana
Bhagavata Purana
 Brahma Vaivarta Purana
Devi-Bhagavata Purana
Garuda Purana
Kurma Purana
Shiva Purana
Skanda Purana
Markandeya Purana
Matsya Purana
Narada Purana
Linga Purana
Padma Purana
Varaha Purana
Vayu Purana
Vishnu Purana
Bengali literature
Mangal-Kāvya
Tamil literature
 Divya Prabandham
Tirumurai
Five Great Epics

Origins and development

Indus Valley Civilisation 

According to Joseph Campbell, the Indus Valley (2600-1900 BCE) may have left traces in the beliefs and traditions of Hinduism. Artefacts have revealed motifs that are also employed and revered by Hindus today, such as primary male deities worshipped by a ruling elite, mother goddesses, nature spirits, snake worship, as well as the reverence of other theriomorphic (animal-shaped) beings. These themes would be maintained by the Dravidian folk religion even after the decline of its parent civilisation around 1800 BCE.

Vedic Period 

A major factor in the development of Hinduism was the Vedic religion. The Indo-Aryan migration brought their distinct beliefs to the Indian subcontinent, where the Vedas were composed around 1500 BCE. The Indo-Aryans Vedic pantheon of deities included the chief god Indra, the sun deity Surya, Ushas, as well as Agni.

Brahmanical Period 

This period saw the composition of commentaries referred to as the Brahmanas.

Upanishad Period 

According to Williams, from 900 - 600 BCE, the protests of the populace against sacrifices made towards the Vedic gods and rebellions against the Brahmin class led to the embrace of reform by the latter and the composition of the fourth Veda and the Vedanta texts. About half of the Upanishads were mystical and unitive, speaking of experiencing the divine as the one (ekam), while the other half promoted devotion to one or more deities. New gods and goddesses were celebrated, and devotional practices began to be introduced.

Sramanic movements
Elements such as those emerging from Buddhism and Jainism made their “heteroprax” contributions to later Hindu mythology, such as temples, indoor shrines, and rituals modeled after service to a divine king. Renunciate traditions contributed elements that questioned sacrifices and the killing of animals, and promoted asceticism and vegetarianism. All of these themes would be incorporated by the Brahmin classes into the later Hindu synthesis, which developed in response to the sramanic movements between ca. 500-300 BCE and 500 CE, and also found their way into Hindu mythology.

Epic Period 

The era from 400 BCE to 400 CE was the period of the compilation of India’s great epics, the Mahabharata and Ramayana. These were central manifestations of the newly developing Hindu synthesis, contributing to a  specific Hindu mythology, emphasising divine action on earth in Vishnu's incarnations and other divine manifestations. The lore of the devas and the asuras expanded. Epic mythology foreshadowed the rich polytheism of the next two periods. The Mahabharata contained two appendices that were extremely important sources for later mythological development, the Bhagavad Gîta and the Harivamsa.

Puranic Period 

According to Williams, the mythology of the Puranas can be broken into three periods (300–500; 500–1000; 1000–1800), or the whole period may simply be referred to as the Hindu middle ages. This age saw the composition of the major Puranic texts of the faith, along with the rise of sectarianism, with followers amassing around the cults of Vishnu, Shiva, or Devi. The three denominations within this period help locate in time historical developments within the sectarian communities, the rise and decline of Tantrism and its influence on mainstream mythology, the tendencies in Puranic mythologising of subordinating Vedic gods and past heroes to ever-increasing moral weaknesses, going on to be identified as a period of exuberant polytheism. However, this was also accompanied with the belief in monotheism, the idea that all paths lead to the Ultimate Reality, Brahman.

Tantric Period 

According to Williams, during the Tantric period from 900 - 1600 CE, the mythology of Tantra and Shaktism revived and enriched blood sacrifice and the pursuit of pleasure as central themes. Tantra’s stories differed radically in meaning from those of epic mythology, which favored devotion, asceticism, and duty. There was either a revival or emphasis that was placed on the shakti or the cosmic energy of goddesses, a concept that had emerged during the Indus Valley Civilisation.

Modern Period 
In the contemporary era, the mythologies of the dominant traditions of Vaishnavism, Shaivism, and Shaktism prevail. Several myths were found or invented to make tribals or former “outcastes” Hindus and bring them within the cultural whole of a reconstructed Hindu mythological community.

Mythical themes and types

Academic studies of mythology often define mythology as deeply valued stories that explain a society's existence and world order: those narratives of a society's creation, the society's origins and foundations, their god(s), their original heroes, mankind's connection to the "divine", and their narratives of eschatology (what happens in the "after-life").  This is a very general outline of some of the basic sacred stories with those themes. In its broadest academic sense, the word myth simply means a traditional story. However, many scholars restrict the term "myth" to sacred stories. Folklorists often go further, defining myths as "tales believed as true, usually sacred, set in the distant past or other worlds or parts of the world, and with extra-human, inhuman, or heroic characters".

In classical Greek, muthos, from which the English word myth derives, meant "story, narrative." Hindu mythology does not often have a consistent, monolithic structure. The same myth typically appears in various versions, and can be represented differently across different regional and socio-religious traditions. Many of these legends evolve across these texts, where the character names change or the story is embellished with greater details. According to Suthren Hirst, these myths have been given a complex range of interpretations. While according to Doniger O'Flaherty, the central message and moral values remain the same.  They have been modified by various philosophical schools over time, and are taken to have deeper, often symbolic, meaning.

Cosmology 

 Brahman The Ultimate Reality in Hinduism
 Satyaloka The abode of Brahma
 Hiranyagarbha The golden egg from which creation emerges
 Vaikuntha The abode of Vishnu
 Goloka The abode of Radha Krishna
 Kailasa The abode of Shiva
 Bhumi The Hindu name for Earth.
 Patala The netherworld
 Svarga The Hindu concept of "heaven", but not strictly related to afterlife, but more like "utopia" in real world.
 Naraka The Hindu concept of "hell", but not a site of permanent damnation

Deities 

Monotheism

Brahman The Ultimate Reality

Vaishnavism (Vishnu-centric)

Vishnu The God of Preservation

Lakshmi The Goddess of Prosperity

Dashavatara Ten incarnations of Vishnu, chiefly Krishna and Rama

Shaivism (Shiva-centric)

Shiva The God of Destruction

Parvati The Goddess of Power

Ganesha The God of Auspiciousness

Kartikeya The God of Victory and War

Shaktism (Goddess-centric)

Mahadevi Supreme Goddess

Saraswati Goddess of Wisdom

Lakshmi Goddess of Prosperity

Parvati Goddess of Power

Henotheism and Polytheism
 Brahma The God of Creation
 Vishnu The God of Preservation
 Shiva The God of Destruction
 Indra The King of the Devas and Svarga
 Saraswati The Goddess of Wisdom
 Lakshmi The Goddess of Prosperity
 Parvati The Goddess of Power
 Ganesha The God of Auspiciousness
 Krishna The God of love and protection
 Radha The goddess of love, chief consort of Krishna
 Rukmini The first queen consort and principal wife of Krishna
 Satyabhama The third queen consort of Krishna
 Bhudevi Goddess Earth
 Kartikeya (Murugan) God of Victory and War
 Rama The seventh incarnation of  Vishnu
 Kali A terrible aspect of Parvati 
 Durga An incarnation of Parvati
 Ashvins Twin gods of medicine
 Agni God of Fire
 Rudra God of the storm 
 Shakti Personification of power
 Vayu God of the wind
 Surya God of the Sun
 Varuna God of the oceans
 Lakshmana Younger Brother of Rama
 Hanuman Highest devotee of Rama
 Sita Consort of Rama and incarnation of Lakshmi
 Sati An incarnation of the goddess Shakti
 Kubera God of Wealth
 Parshurama The sixth incarnation of Vishnu
 Yama God of Death and the Underworld
 Chandra God Moon
 Balarama incarnation of Shesha Naag
 Prajapati Creator deity
 Kalki Prophesied final incarnation of Vishnu
 Dashavatara (Ten Incarnations of Vishnu)
 Narada Divine sage, messenger of gods
 Sundaravalli Daughter of Vishnu, consort of Murugan
 Devasena Daughter of Vishnu, consort of Murugan
 Kamadeva The God of love and desire
 Rati The Goddess of love and desire
Dravidian folk religion (Indigenous Dravidian faith)

 Mariamman Mother goddess
 Ayyanar Guardian deity
 Ayyappan God of Dharma

Connections to other belief systems 

Hinduism shares mythemes with Buddhism, Jainism, and Sikhism.

See also
 
 Dashavatara
 Greek mythology
 Hindu cosmology
 Hindu deities
 Hindu eschatology
 Hindu scriptures
 Meitei mythology
 Proto-Indo-European religion
 Proto-Indo-Iranian religion
 Puranic chronology
 Saga
 Vedic mythology

Citations

General sources

Further reading

External links 

 Clay Sanskrit Library publishes classical Indian literature, including the Mahabharata and Ramayana, with facing-page text and translation. Also offers searchable corpus and downloadable materials.
 Sanskrit Documents Collection: Documents in ITX format of Upanishads, Stotras etc.